"7 Rooms of Gloom" is a song recorded by the Motown Records vocal quartet the Four Tops. It was released as a single in 1967 on the Motown label and reached #14 on the Billboard Hot 100, and was a Top 10 R&B Hit, charting at #10. It was also a hit in the UK, their seventh, staying for nine weeks in the UK Singles Charts and reaching #12 and in the Netherlands where it made #23 in the Dutch Top 40.

Described as "throbbing with dread over a racing minor key dominated arrangement" it was written by Holland–Dozier–Holland. The single's B-side was "I'll Turn to Stone" also written by Holland-Dozier-Holland with R Dean Taylor. That song made a separate chart entry, and peaked at #76 on the Billboard Hot 100 and #50 on the R&B Charts.

Cash Box called it a "thumping, fast-moving, blues-oriented rocker" that is a "real powerhouse."

The song begins with Levi Stubbs doing a spoken recitation, which gets repeated twice with alterations.

Personnel
 Levi Stubbs – lead vocals
 Abdul "Duke" Fakir – background vocals
 Renaldo "Obie" Benson – background vocals
 Lawrence Payton – background vocals
 Jackie Hicks – background vocals
 Marlene Barrow – background vocals
 Louvain Demps – background vocals
 Funk Brothers – instrumentation

References

1966 songs
1967 singles
Four Tops songs
Songs written by Holland–Dozier–Holland
Song recordings produced by Brian Holland
Song recordings produced by Lamont Dozier
Motown singles